Hector Godinez Fundamental High School is a public high school in Santa Ana, California, and is part of the Santa Ana Unified School District. The school opened in 2007.

Origin of name
Godinez Fundamental High School was named in honor of Orange County's first Latino postmaster, Hector Godinez (1924 – 1999).

History
Godinez Fundamental High School was opened in the fall of 2007. The Godinez school mascot is the grizzly bear.

2015-2016 Soccer Season
The 2015–16 Godinez Soccer Team went undefeated in the Orange Coast League with a record of 9–0–1. They had an all competitions record of 22–2–4 this record ranked them #19 nationally and #6 in California.  They are currently the CIF-SS Division 4 champions and the Regional Division 4 runners-up. This was the first CIF title ever won by the school.

2018-2019 Softball Season
The 2018-2019 Godinez Softball Team went undefeated in their first year in the Golden West League with a record of 10–0–0, and an overall competition record of 26–4–0. They were placed in the first round of the CIF Division 4 Playoffs after being crowned league champions, where they faced off against St. Anthony High School. After defeating them 14-5, they advanced to the next round where they would clinch a spot in the quarterfinals after beating Heritage High School 9-4.

In the quarterfinals, Godinez played against Maranatha High School on their home field, beating them 5-0, and then went on to seal their spot in the CIF Division 4 Softball Championship by beating Culver City High School 5-0. The championships were played at Deanna Manning Stadium,

In the championships, Godinez faced off against El Segundo High School. During the first inning, El Segundo took an early lead by scoring a run, however, Godinez quickly responded by scoring 4 consecutive runs in the bottom of the inning after El Segundo pitcher Kaili Reitano was called on an illegal pitch. After taking the lead, Godinez went on to score a subsequent 11 more runs, and ended the game 15-1. The outstanding victory won the Godinez Softball Team their very first CIF title, and the third title overall for the school.

Reference links
http://www.sausd.us/godinez
http://nces.ed.gov/globallocator/sch_info_popup.asp?Type=Public&ID=063531012133

References

2007 establishments in California
Educational institutions established in 2007
High schools in Santa Ana, California
Public high schools in California